"Straightaway" Jazz Themes is an album released by Canadian jazz trumpeter Maynard Ferguson containing music composed for the 1961–1962 television series Straightaway. The album was recorded in 1961 and released by Roulette.

Reception

At AllMusic, Scott Yanow gave the album three stars, writing, "this is one of the lesser Maynard recordings from this busy era (none of the material is all that memorable) but fans of his big band should enjoy the somewhat obscure music anyway."

Track listing
All of the tracks were composed by Maynard Ferguson.

 "Straightaway" – 2:20
 "Apprehensions" – 4:14
 "Mambo Le Mans" – 5:10
 "Cocky Scott" – 3:44
 "Up Shift" – 2:45
 "Last Lap" – 3:51
 "Melancholia" – 2:23
 "Pit Stop" – 2:02
 "Stroking" – 5:57
 "After the Race" – 2:06

Personnel 
 Maynard Ferguson – trumpet
 Bill Berry – trumpet
 Chet Ferretti – trumpet
 Don Rader – trumpet
 Kenny Rupp – trombone
 Ray Winslow – trombone
 Lanny Morgan – alto saxophone
 Willie Maiden – tenor saxophone, arrangements
 Don Menza – tenor saxophone
 Frank Hittner – baritone saxophone
 Jaki Byard – piano
 John Neves – double bass 
 Rufus Jones – drums
 Don Sebesky – arrangements

References 

1961 albums
Maynard Ferguson albums
Roulette Records albums
Albums produced by Teddy Reig
Albums arranged by Don Sebesky